Under the Seas is a silent film made in 1907 by the French director Georges Méliès. The film, a parody of the 1870 novel Twenty Thousand Leagues Under the Sea by Jules Verne, follows a fisherman who dreams of traveling by submarine to the bottom of the ocean, where he encounters both realistic and fanciful sea creatures, including a chorus of naiads.

Plot
Yves, a fisherman, comes home after a tiring day of fishing and soon falls asleep. In his dream, he is visited by the Fairy of the Ocean, who leads him to a submarine. Yves is made Lieutenant-in-Command and sets off on a submarine voyage.

A panorama of undersea views follow, including shipwrecks, underwater grottoes, huge shellfish, sea nymphs, sea monsters, starfish, mermaids, and a ballet of naiads. The ballet is interrupted by Yves, whose inexperience with submarines leads him to run his craft aground on a rock. Yves leaves the wrecked submarine and chases after the departing naiads, but is attacked by huge fish and crabs. He escapes and travels past further underwater marvels, including underwater caves, anemones, corals, giant seahorses, and an octopus that attacks him. However, in vengeance for all the fish Yves has caught in his career, goddesses of the sea trap the fisherman in a net and let him fall into a gigantic hollow sponge, from which he struggles to escape.

Waking up from the dream, Yves realizes that he has fallen from his bed into his bathtub, and is entangled in his own fishing net. His neighbors and friends free him from the confusion, and he treats them all to drinks at the nearest café.

Production and release
The actor Manuel, who had appeared in Méliès's 1906 drama A Desperate Crime and who would go on to direct some films for Méliès's studio in 1908, plays Yves the fisherman; the chorus of naiads are played by dancers from the Théâtre du Châtelet. The ballet in the film was choreographed by Madame Stitchel, the director of the Châtelet corps de ballet; Stitchel also choreographed dances for other Méliès films, including The Chimney Sweep. Méliès's design for the film includes cut-out sea animals patterned after Alphonse de Neuville's illustrations for Verne's novel.

It was released by Méliès's Star Film Company and is numbered 912–924 in its catalogues, where it was advertised as a grande féerie fantaisiste en 30 tableaux. Like at least 4% of Méliès's entire output, some prints of the film were hand-tinted frame by frame by female factory workers and sold at a higher price.

The film survives as an incomplete fragment; some scenes are presumed lost.

See also 
 1907 in science fiction

Notes

Footnotes

References

External links
 
 Under the Seas at the Internet Archive (full length short film)

1907 films
1900s science fiction adventure films
Films based on Twenty Thousand Leagues Under the Sea
Films about nightmares
Films directed by Georges Méliès
French black-and-white films
French silent short films
French science fiction films
Films about mermaids
1907 short films
Silent horror films
Silent science fiction adventure films